The December 2020 Gijet massacre was a mass extrajudicial killing that took place in Gijet in the Tigray Region of Ethiopia during the Tigray War, on 30 December 2020. Gijet is the central town of woreda Saharti, southeastern zone of Tigray.

Massacre
The Ethiopian National Defense Force (ENDF) killed 21 youngsters, including a seven-year-old child in Gijet (SE Tigray) on 30 December 2020.

Typical massacres committed by Ethiopian and Eritrean soldiers in the Tigray war are (1) revenge when they lose a battle; (2) to terrorise and extract information about whereabouts of TPLF leaders; (3) murder of suspected family members of TDF fighters; and (4) terrorising the Tigray society as a whole such as in case of mass killings in churches.

Perpetrators
Dimtsi Woyane reported the perpetrators of this massacre as being the Ethiopian army.

Victims
The “Tigray: Atlas of the humanitarian situation” mentions 21 victims of this massacre.

Reactions
The “Tigray: Atlas of the humanitarian situation”, that documented this massacre received international media attention, particularly regarding its Annex A, that lists massacres in the Tigray War.

After months of denial by the Ethiopian authorities that massacres occurred in Tigray, a joint investigation by OHCHR and the Ethiopian Human Rights Commission was announced in March 2021.

See also 
Murders and massacres in the Tigray War
Timeline of the Tigray War – December 2020
February 2021 Saharti-Samre massacres, including another 120 people killed in Gijet
March 2021 Saharti-Samre massacres, including another 123 people killed in Gijet

References

External links
World Peace Foundation: Starving Tigray

2020 in Ethiopia
Conflicts in 2020
Wars involving Eritrea
Wars involving Ethiopia
Massacres in 2020
21st-century mass murder in Africa
December 2020 crimes in Africa
2020 murders in Ethiopia
Extrajudicial killings in Ethiopia
Mass murder in Africa
History of Ethiopia
Attacks in Ethiopia
December 2020 events in Africa
2020 massacres of the Tigray War